Emma Pask (born 1977) is an Australian jazz vocalist. She is best known for her work with big bands and her continuing collaboration with noted Australian virtuoso James Morrison.

Early life
Pask grew up in the Sutherland Shire of Sydney in the suburb of Como. She attended Como Public School and Kirrawee High School.

While singing with her high school band at 14, Pask was discovered by Morrison at a school performance in 1994 at 16. From then on, she has been the vocal feature of Morrison's bands. She also has a background in acting. In 1995, she undertook a one-year part-time course at the National Institute of Dramatic Art young actor's studio.

She performed for the late Diana, Princess of Wales, Princess Mary of Denmark and in 2006 she had the honour of singing at the wedding of Keith Urban and Nicole Kidman.

Personal life
She is married to Rodrigo Ocaño Da Silva, who is from Uruguay, and together they live in Bondi Beach, NSW, Australia.

Pask enjoys ocean swimming off Bondi Beach with the Bondi Icebergs.

Discography

Albums

Charting singles

Awards and nominations

ARIA Music Awards
The ARIA Music Awards is an annual awards ceremony that recognises excellence, innovation, and achievement across all genres of Australian music.

! 
|-
| 2014
| Season of My Heart
| ARIA Award for Best Jazz Album
| 
|
|-
| 2016
| Cosita Divina
| ARIA Award for Best Jazz Album
| 
|
|-
|}

Mo Awards
The Australian Entertainment Mo Awards (commonly known informally as the Mo Awards), were annual Australian entertainment industry awards. They recognise achievements in live entertainment in Australia from 1975 to 2016.
 (wins only)
|-
| 2004
| Emma Pask
| Jazz Vocal Performer of the Year 
| 
|-

References

External links
Official website

1977 births
Living people
Australian jazz singers
Singers from Sydney
21st-century Australian singers
21st-century Australian women singers